George Henry Lee I, 2nd Earl of Lichfield (1690–1743) was a younger son of Edward Henry Lee, 1st Earl of Lichfield and his wife Charlotte Fitzroy, an illegitimate daughter of Charles II by his mistress, the celebrated courtesan Barbara Villiers. On 14 July 1716 George Henry Lee succeeded his father as the 2nd Earl of Lichfield.

Birth and origins 
George was born on 12 March 1690 in St. James Park, London. He was one of the ten children and the fourth of the sons of Edward Henry Lee and his wife Charlotte Fitzroy. His father was created Viscount Quarendon and Earl of Lichfield just before his marriage. George's mother was a natural daughter of Charles II and Barbara Villiers.

Early life 
George became heir apparent and was given the corresponding courtesy title of Viscount Quarendon when his eldest brother, Edward Henry, died in 1713. On 14 July 1716 his father died and he succeeded as the 2nd Earl of Lichfield.

Marriage and children 
In about 1717 Lord Lichfield, as he was now, married Frances Hales (died 3 February 1769), daughter of Sir John Hales, 4th Baronet of Hackington, of Woodchurch in Kent.

 
George and Frances had three sons:
George Henry (1718–1772), his successor
Edward Henry (died 1742)
Charles Henry (died 1740)

—and five daughters:
Charlotte, married to Henry Dillon, 11th Viscount Dillon
Mary, married to Cosmas Neville, Esquire
Frances, married Henry Hyde, 5th Baron Hyde
Henrietta or Harriet, married to John Bellew, 4th Baron Bellew of Duleek
Anne, married to Hugh Edward Henry Clifford, 5th Baron Clifford of Chudleigh

Later life, death, and succession 
In 1719 Lord Lichfield was one of main subscribers in the Royal Academy of Music (1719), a corporation that produced baroque opera on stage. In 1722 he built the Oxfordshire Stately home, Ditchley, designed by James Gibbs. Lichfield was educated at St John's College, Oxford and created a D.C.L. of Oxford on 19 August 1732. On 7 August 1739 he was made Custos Brevium in the Court of Common Pleas, as well as a governor of the Foundling Hospital.

Lichfield died on 15 February 1743 and was buried in Spelsbury. He was succeeded by his son and namesake, George Henry Lee II.

See also 
 Lee Baronets of Quarendon, Buckinghamshire, 1611–1776.

References

Bibliography
 
 
  – L to M (for Lichfield)
  – (for timeline)
Murdoch, Tessa (ed.), Noble Households: Eighteenth-Century Inventories of Great English Houses (Cambridge, John Adamson, 2006)  . For an inventory of the earl's furniture at Ditchley, Oxfordshire, following his death in 1743, see pp. 145–52.

Lee, George Henry
Lee, George Henry
Alumni of St John's College, Oxford
2nd Earl of Lichfield
People associated with the Royal Academy of Music